Tourin–Ballinwillin GAA Club is a Gaelic Athletic Association club located in County Waterford, Ireland between Cappoquin and Lismore. It has one Waterford Senior Hurling Championship title which was won in 1950. The club colours are red and white vertical stripes. The club goes by the name of 'Tourin' for hurling and 'Ballinwillin' for Gaelic Football.

History 
In 2009, Tourin joined forces with another local club, Mount Melleray GAA. The new (amalgamated) club takes part in the Junior Premier section in the Waterford Hurling and Football Championships.  On 10 October 2009, Tourin won the Western Junior hurling final, beating Ballinameela GAA by 2-18 to 2-14 at Fraher Field.  Two weeks later,  Tourin Glen Rovers added the Waterford Junior Hurling Championship title, defeating Kill by 3 points. They were proposed to the Waterford Intermediate Hurling Championship for the 2010 season.

Notable players
Shane Fives
Jim Fives
Darragh Fives

Honours
 Waterford Senior Hurling Championships (1): 1950
 Waterford Junior Hurling Championships (4): 1941, 1949, 1977, 2009
 Waterford Junior Football Championships: (3): 1912, 1952, 1971

References

Gaelic games clubs in County Waterford
Hurling clubs in County Waterford
Gaelic football clubs in County Waterford